Derek Shybunka (born September 25, 1970) is a Canadian former professional ice hockey and inline hockey goaltender.

Shybunka played with the Canadian men's national team at the 2008 IIHF Men's InLine Hockey World Championship where he selected as the tournament's best goaltender.

Awards and honours

References

External links

1970 births
Living people
Canadian ice hockey goaltenders
New Mexico Scorpions (WPHL) players
Ice hockey people from Edmonton
Tulsa Oilers (1992–present) players
Waco Wizards players
Canadian expatriate ice hockey players in the United States